Niamey is the capital and largest city of Niger. Niamey lies on the Niger River, primarily situated on the east bank. Niamey's population was counted as 1,026,848 as of the 2012 census. As of 2017, population projections show the capital district growing at a slower rate than the country as a whole, which has the world's highest fertility rate. The city is located in a pearl millet growing region, while manufacturing industries include bricks, ceramic goods, cement, and weaving.

History

Niamey was probably founded in the 18th century and originated as a cluster of small villages (Gaweye, Kalley, Maourey, Zongo and Foulani Koira). Niamey was of little importance until the French developed it as a colonial centre in the late 1890s. The town, then with an estimated population of some 1,800, was chosen as the capital of the newly created Military Territory of Niger in 1905, however, the capital was shifted to the more established city of Zinder in 1912. Zinder's proximity to the Nigerian border and distance from French-controlled ports prompted the French to move the capital back to Niamey in 1926, by which time the city had some 3,000 inhabitants. A series of devastating droughts prompted significant population growth during this period, and by 1945 the population was about 8,000.

Prior to 1926-27 the Upper Volta-Niger border ran along the Niger river, meaning that Niamey lay directly on the boundary.

At the time of independence in 1960 the population had grown to around 30,000. The period from 1970 to 1988 was one in which the economy of Niger boomed, driven by revenue from the uranium mines at Arlit. Continuing droughts also caused many rural Nigeriens to move to the growing city.

In 1992 Niamey and its immediate hinterland were split off from Niamey Region to form the much smaller Niamey Capital District, enclaved within the new Tillabéri Region.

By some estimates, the population had reached 700,000 in 2000. In 2011, government press estimated the total urban population at over 1.5 million. A major cause of the increase has been in migration for work and during droughts, as well as high population growth. This last factor means that demographically a majority of the city's citizens are young people.

Geography

The Niamey region straddles between the Liptako, corresponding to the northern extremity of the East ridge of Man, and the south-western edge of the Iullemmeden basin. At Niamey, the river, running almost straight SSE from Gao, Mali, makes a series of wide bends. The city was founded on the east ("left bank") of the river as it meanders from west to east flow to run almost directly south. A series of marshy islands begin at Niamey and extend south in the river.

The vast majority of the population and government and commercial buildings are located on the eastern bank of the river. The very centre of the centre contains a number of wide boulevards linking roundabouts. Two bridges connect the two sides - the Kennedy Bridge and the Friendship Bridge. The western bank area consists mainly of residential areas such as Gaweye, Saguia, Lamorde, Saga, and Karadje, as well as Abdou Moumouni University.

Climate
Most of the rainfall is from late June to mid-September. There is practically no rain from October to April. Niamey is remarkably hot throughout the year. In fact, it is one of the hottest major cities on the planet. Average monthly high temperatures reach  four months out of the year and in no month do average high temperatures fall below . During the dry season, particularly from November through February, nights are generally cool.

Demographics

Niamey's population has grown rapidly since independence - the droughts of the early 1970s and 1980s, along with the economic crisis of the early 1980s, have propelled an exodus of rural inhabitants to Niger's largest city. Its population increased gradually, from about 3,000 in 1930 to about 30,000 in 1960, rising to 250,000 in 1980 and, according to the official statistics, to 800,000 in 2000. Under the military government of General Seyni Kountché, there were strict controls on residency and the government would regularly round up and "deport" those without permits back to their villages. The growing freedoms of the late 1980s and 1990s, along with the Tuareg Rebellion of the 1990s and famine in the 2000s, have reinforced this process of internal migration, with large informal settlements appearing on the outskirts of the city. Noticeable in the city's centre since the 1980s are groups of poor, young, or handicapped beggars. Within the richer or more trafficked neighbourhoods, these beggars have in fact formed a well-regulated hierarchical system in which beggars garner sadaka according to cultural and religious norms.

In the 1990s, the capital district population growth rate was lower than the torrid national rate, suggesting large rural migration (urbanization) was negligible in Niger, there is an undercount, and/or the government's forced urban to rural deportations were effective.

Culture and architecture

A major attraction in the city is the Niger National Museum, which incorporates a zoo, a museum of vernacular architecture, a craft centre, and exhibits including dinosaur skeletons and the Tree of Ténéré. Other places of interest include the American, French and Nigerien cultural centres, seven major market centres (including the large Niamey Grand Market), a traditional wrestling arena, and a horse racing track. Most of the colourful pottery sold in Niamey is hand made in the nearby village of Boubon.

In December 2005, it was the host of the Jeux de la Francophonie.

Places of worship
Niger being a predominantly Muslim country, mosques are the most common places of worship, with the Grande Mosquée being the largest in the city. There are also various Christian churches, most notably Our Lady of Perpetual Help Cathedral and the Cathedral de Maourey.

Governance

Administration
Niamey makes up a special capital district of Niger, which is surrounded by the Region of Tillabéri.

The city of Niamey itself is governed as an autonomous first-level administrative block, the Niamey Urban Community (Fr. Communauté Urbaine de Niamey, or CUN). It includes five Urban Communes, divided into 44 "Districts" and 99 "Quartiers", including formerly independent towns. It is a co-equal first division subdivision with the seven Regions of Niger. The Niamey Urban Community includes an administration and Governor appointed by national leaders. Like the rest of Niger, Niamey has seen a decentralisation of governance since 2000. Government Ordinance n°2010–56 and Presidential Decree n°2010-679 of September 2010 mandated an elected City Council for the city of Niamey, subsumed under the CUN. This excludes some outlying areas of the CUN. Forty-five councillors are popularly elected and in turn elect the Mayor of the City of Niamey. In July 2011, the first Mayor under the new system, Oumarou Dogari Moumouni, was installed by the Governor of the CUN Mrs. Aïchatou Boulama Kané and the City Council. The City Council and Mayor have limited roles compared to the CUN Governor. Niamey has a third layer of government in the Commune system. Each Commune elects its own council, and outside major cities, these function like independent cities. Niamey and other major cities have been, since the advent of decentralisation, developing co-ordination of Commune governments in large cities made up of multiple Communes.

Under this devolution process formalised in the 1999 Constitution of Niger, the CUN contains five urban communes, which are further divided into 99 quarters ("Quartiers") with elected boards.

Communes and quarters
The CUN includes 99 quarters:

The CUN includes land where there were formerly several surrounding towns and villages which the city of Niamey has now annexed. These include Soudouré, Lamordé, Gamkallé, Yantala, and Gaweye.

Until 1998, all of greater Niamey was part of Tillabéri Region, which prior to 1992 was named the Niamey Department. The CUN remains surrounded on all sides by Tillabéri Region.

Transport

Niamey is served by the Diori Hamani International Airport, located 12 km southeast of the city and is crossed by the RN1 highway. Niamey railway station, officially inaugurated in April 2014, is the first one built in Niger. Boats are also used to travel the Niger River.

Education
The city is also the site of the National School of Administration, Abdou Moumouni University, the Higher Institute of Mining, Industry and Geology which lies on the right bank of the river, and many institutes (Centre Numérique de Niamey, IRD, ICRISAT, Hydrologic Institute, etc.) Niamey hosts the African Centre of Meteorological Application for Development.

References

Bibliography

External links

Niger Assemblee Nationale  official website

 
Capitals in Africa
Populated places in Niger
Communities on the Niger River
Capital districts and territories
Regions of Niger
Populated places established in the 2nd millennium